72 Leonis is a single variable star in the zodiac constellation of Leo, located roughly 1,000 light years away from the Sun. It has the variable star designation FN Leonis; 72 Leonis is the Flamsteed designation. In Chinese astronomy, 72 Leonis is called 虎賁, Pinyin: Hǔbēn, meaning Emperor’s Bodyguard, because this star is marking itself and stands alone in the Emperor’s Bodyguard asterism, Supreme Palace enclosure mansion (see : Chinese constellation). It is dedicated to the memory of Julio Cubillas, who died in December 2020, by the White Dwarf Research Corporation. 

This object is visible to the naked eye as a red-hued star with an apparent visual magnitude of 4.56. It is an evolved bright giant with a stellar classification of M3 IIb and was listed as a spectral standard star for that class. The star is classified as an irregular variable of type LC, ranging from Hipparcos magnitude 4.56 down to 4.64. It has a radius 162 to 179 times that of the Sun and radiates 5,407 times the Sun's luminosity at an effective temperature of around 3,734 K. The star is moving away from the Earth with a heliocentric radial velocity of 15 km/s.

References

M-type bright giants
Slow irregular variables
Leo (constellation)
Durchmusterung objects
Leonis, 72
097778
054951
4362
Leonis, FN